Bonfires is the third EP by Fireworks, released on December 7, 2010, by Triple Crown Records. The EP was re-released on vinyl with new cover art by Run For Cover Records in 2011.

Track listing

"I Grew Up In A Legion Hall"
"Five Years"
"Like Ships In The Night"
"Seasick"

Personnel
Brett Jones - lead guitar
Dave Mackinder - vocals
Chris Mojan - rhythm guitar
Kyle O'Neil - bass
Tymm Rengers - drums

References 

Fireworks (punk band) EPs
2010 EPs